Raymond Duryea Wallace (born December 3, 1963) is a former American football running back in the National Football League who played for the Houston Oilers and Pittsburgh Steelers. He played college football for the Purdue Boilermakers.

References

1963 births
Living people
American football running backs
Houston Oilers players
Pittsburgh Steelers players
Purdue Boilermakers football players